Dyirbal may refer to:

 Dyirbal people, an ethnic group of Australia
 Dyirbal language, their language

See also 
 Gerbil (disambiguation)

Language and nationality disambiguation pages